The FIBA Asia Champions Cup 2007 was the 18th staging of the FIBA Asia Champions Cup, the basketball club tournament of FIBA Asia. The tournament was held in Tehran, Iran. Saba Battery of Tehran, Iran won the tournament after beating Al-Jalaa of Aleppo, Syria

Preliminary round

Group A

Group B

Knockout round

Championship

5th–7th places

Quarterfinals

Semifinals

Finals

Final standings

Awards
Most Valuable Player:  S. Nikkhah (Saba Battery Tehran)

External links
Fibaasia.net

2007
Champions Cup
Champions Cup
FIBA Asia Champions Cup 2007